The SEAT Cupra GT is a GT race car made by SEAT and introduced in a world premiere first as a concept car on 24 April 2003 at the Barcelona Motor Show. The final version of the Cupra GT was presented later, produced on customer demand by the Spanish car manufacturer's SEAT Sport division in a limited series addressed to racing teams or individuals aiming to participate in GT races like the Spanish GT Championship.

The SEAT Sport division has worked with the SEAT Design Center in Sitges, in order to create the racer with the design essence of the SEAT Salsa and SEAT Tango concept cars. Thus the SEAT Cupra GT incorporates the brand's 'auto emoción' philosophy, featuring the distinctive Walter de Silva's curved 'Dynamic Line' descending on the sides of the car from the front to the rear.

Engine
The motor is placed longitudinally at rear central position  and the output is being routed through a rear-wheel drive layout including a 6 speed sequential transmission.

Suspension, brakes and tires
The Cupra GT, by the time it was presented as a concept car, was equipped with independent double wishbones with Öhlins coil shock absorbers, all-round ventilated disc brakes ( front,  rear) with Brembo's AP Racing brake calipers painted in a dark titanium nuance, and tires (265/650 front, 285/680 rear) mounted to titanium coloured six double spoke 18' alloy wheels. Intended to run in GT races, the car's wheels were secured with a single bolt saving time during the wheel changes.

Performance

References

External links

Cupra GT